The Rudi (Rughi) Monastery is a monastery in Rudi, Moldova. It was established in Moldavia, in 1777.

Gallery

External links 
 
 Mănăstirea "Rudi" sau "Rughi"  
 Mănăstiri din Moldova - «Rudi»  

Religious buildings and structures in Moldova
Churches in Moldova
Religious buildings and structures completed in 1777
Christian monasteries in Moldova
Christian monasteries established in the 18th century
Soroca District